The Herald Cycle Tour is an annual cycle race held in Gqeberha, South Africa. It features both 105 km and 46 km road race events.

History 
The Herald was started in 1986 by Rob Rudman, Peter Dickason, and Tony Lutz. The first Herald Cycle Tour in 1986 had 350 competitors, by 2007 there were over 3500 cyclists competing in the event.

Results 
Men:
 2003- Nicolas White: 2hrs 31min
 2004- Jamie Ball: 2hrs 38min
 2005- Malcolm Lange: 2hrs 38min
 2006- Noland Hoffmann: 2hrs 28min
 2007- Janse van Rensburg: 2hrs 33min
 2008- Janse van Rensburg: 2hrs 35min

External links
 

Cycle races in South Africa
Recurring sporting events established in 1986
Men's road bicycle races
1986 establishments in South Africa